The 3rd constituency of the Alpes Maritimes is a French legislative constituency in the Alpes Maritimes département.  It goes around the outskirts of the city of Nice, including the communities of Falicon, Saint-André-de-la-Roche, and La Trinité.  At the last count, it had 109,573 inhabitants.

It is currently represented by Philippe Pradal of Horizons.

Historic representation

Election results

2022

2017

2012

|- style="background-color:#E9E9E9;text-align:center;"
! colspan="2" rowspan="2" style="text-align:left;" | Candidate
! rowspan="2" colspan="2" style="text-align:left;" | Party
! colspan="2" | 1st round
! colspan="2" | 2nd round
|- style="background-color:#E9E9E9;text-align:center;"
! width="75" | Votes
! width="30" | %
! width="75" | Votes
! width="30" | %
|-
| style="background-color:" |
| style="text-align:left;" | Rudy Salles
| style="text-align:left;" | New Centre
| NC
| 
| 36.80%
| 
| 58.73%
|-
| style="background-color:" |
| style="text-align:left;" | Christine Dorejo
| style="text-align:left;" | Socialist Party
| PS
| 
| 23.01%
| 
| 41.27%
|-
| style="background-color:" |
| style="text-align:left;" | Gaël Nofri
| style="text-align:left;" | National Front
| FN
| 
| 22.75%
| colspan="2" style="text-align:left;" |
|-
| style="background-color:" |
| style="text-align:left;" | Roseline Grac
| style="text-align:left;" | Left Front
| FG
| 
| 5.01%
| colspan="2" style="text-align:left;" |
|-
| style="background-color:" |
| style="text-align:left;" | Jean-Christophe Picard
| style="text-align:left;" | Regionalist
| REG
| 
| 4.29%
| colspan="2" style="text-align:left;" |
|-
| style="background-color:" |
| style="text-align:left;" | Marouane Bouloudhnine
| style="text-align:left;" | Centre for France
| MoDem
| 
| 1.76%
| colspan="2" style="text-align:left;" |
|-
| style="background-color:" |
| style="text-align:left;" | Marie-José Vallad
| style="text-align:left;" | Ecologist
| ECO
| 
| 1.18%
| colspan="2" style="text-align:left;" |
|-
| style="background-color:" |
| style="text-align:left;" | Bruno Della Sudda
| style="text-align:left;" | Far Left
| EXG
| 
| 1.09%
| colspan="2" style="text-align:left;" |
|-
| style="background-color:" |
| style="text-align:left;" | Marie-Edith Cattet
| style="text-align:left;" | Other far-right
| EXD
| 
| 0.82%
| colspan="2" style="text-align:left;" |
|-
| style="background-color:" |
| style="text-align:left;" | Delphine Delétang
| style="text-align:left;" | Ecologist
| ECO
| 
| 0.71%
| colspan="2" style="text-align:left;" |
|-
| style="background-color:" |
| style="text-align:left;" | Sylvain Maillot
| style="text-align:left;" | Others
| AUT
| 
| 0.52%
| colspan="2" style="text-align:left;" |
|-
| style="background-color:" |
| style="text-align:left;" | Didier Burdin
| style="text-align:left;" | Miscellaneous Right
| DVD
| 
| 0.49%
| colspan="2" style="text-align:left;" |
|-
| style="background-color:" |
| style="text-align:left;" | Patrick Monica
| style="text-align:left;" | Miscellaneous Right
| DVD
| 
| 0.46%
| colspan="2" style="text-align:left;" |
|-
| style="background-color:" |
| style="text-align:left;" | Laurent Baccino
| style="text-align:left;" | Far Left
| EXG
| 
| 0.35%
| colspan="2" style="text-align:left;" |
|-
| style="background-color:" |
| style="text-align:left;" | Denis Roos
| style="text-align:left;" | Miscellaneous Right
| DVD
| 
| 0.30%
| colspan="2" style="text-align:left;" |
|-
| style="background-color:" |
| style="text-align:left;" | Igor Kurek
| style="text-align:left;" | Miscellaneous Right
| DVD
| 
| 0.26%
| colspan="2" style="text-align:left;" |
|-
| style="background-color:" |
| style="text-align:left;" | Marie-José Pereira
| style="text-align:left;" | Far Left
| EXG
| 
| 0.17%
| colspan="2" style="text-align:left;" |
|-
| colspan="8" style="background-color:#E9E9E9;"|
|- style="font-weight:bold"
| colspan="4" style="text-align:left;" | Total
| 
| 100%
| 
| 100%
|-
| colspan="8" style="background-color:#E9E9E9;"|
|-
| colspan="4" style="text-align:left;" | Registered voters
| 
| style="background-color:#E9E9E9;"|
| 
| style="background-color:#E9E9E9;"|
|-
| colspan="4" style="text-align:left;" | Blank/Void ballots
| 
| 0.64%
| 
| 2.04%
|-
| colspan="4" style="text-align:left;" | Turnout
| 
| 54.81%
| 
| 50.88%
|-
| colspan="4" style="text-align:left;" | Abstentions
| 
| 45.19%
| 
| 49.12%
|-
| colspan="8" style="background-color:#E9E9E9;"|
|- style="font-weight:bold"
| colspan="6" style="text-align:left;" | Result
| colspan="2" style="background-color:" | | NC HOLD
|}

2007

2002

 
 
 
 
 
|-
| colspan="8" bgcolor="#E9E9E9"|
|-

1997

 
 
 
 
 
 
 
|-
| colspan="8" bgcolor="#E9E9E9"|
|-

Sources

Results at the Ministry of the Interior (French)

3